In statistical mechanics, a universality class is a collection of mathematical models which share a single scale invariant limit under the process of renormalization group flow. While the models within a class may differ dramatically at finite scales, their behavior will become increasingly similar as the limit scale is approached. In particular, asymptotic phenomena such as critical exponents will be the same for all models in the class.

Some well-studied universality classes are the ones containing the Ising model or the percolation theory at their respective phase transition points; these are both families of classes, one for each lattice dimension. Typically, a family of universality classes will have a lower and upper critical dimension: below the lower critical dimension, the universality class becomes degenerate (this dimension is 2d for the Ising model, or for directed percolation, but 1d for undirected percolation), and above the upper critical dimension the critical exponents stabilize and can be calculated by an analog of mean-field theory (this dimension is 4d for Ising or for directed percolation, and 6d for undirected percolation).

List of critical exponents
Critical exponents are defined in terms of the variation of certain physical properties of the system near its phase transition point. These physical properties will include its reduced temperature , its order parameter measuring how much of the system is in the "ordered" phase, the specific heat, and so on.

The exponent  is the exponent relating the specific heat C to the reduced temperature: we have . The specific heat will usually be singular at the critical point, but the minus sign in the definition of  allows it to remain positive.
The exponent  relates the order parameter  to the temperature. Unlike most critical exponents it is assumed positive, since the order parameter will usually be zero at the critical point. So we have .
The exponent  relates the temperature with the system's response to an external driving force, or source field. We have , with J the driving force.
The exponent  relates the order parameter to the source field at the critical temperature, where this relationship becomes nonlinear. We have  (hence ), with the same meanings as before.
The exponent  relates the size of correlations (i.e. patches of the ordered phase) to the temperature; away from the critical point these are characterized by a correlation length . We have .
The exponent  measures the size of correlations at the critical temperature.
The exponent , used in percolation theory, measures the size of the largest clusters (roughly, the largest ordered blocks) at 'temperatures' (connection probabilities) below the critical point. So .

For symmetries, the group listed gives the symmetry of the order parameter.

References

External links
  Universality classes from Sklogwiki
 Zinn-Justin, Jean (2002). Quantum field theory and critical phenomena, Oxford, Clarendon Press (2002), 
 
 

Critical phenomena
Renormalization group
Scale-invariant systems